Langoëlan is a commune in the Morbihan department of Brittany in north-western France. Inhabitants of Langoëlan are called in French Langoëlanais.

Geography

Langoëlan is located in the northwestern part of Morbihan. Historically, it belongs to Vannetais and Pays Pourlet. Langoëlan is border by Mellionnec and Lescouët-Gouarec to the north, by Silfiac and Séglien to the east, by Locmalo to the south and by Ploërdut to the west. The river Scorff flows through the commune. The wood of Coet Codu is in the northern part of the commune.

Map

List of places

Demographics

History
thumb|Monument erected in memory of the french victims of the Kergoët battle.
The battle of Kergoët took place on July 1, 1944 in Langoëlan. About thirty five german soldiers were killed in the fight. A monument was erected in memory of the french victims of the Kergoët battle. Some french victims were tortured by the germans. A farmer, Joseph Le Padellec, were savagely beaten by the germans and shot dead.

See also
Communes of the Morbihan department

References

External links

 Mayors of Morbihan Association 

Communes of Morbihan